Tessa Joseph is an Indian model-turned-actress who works in Malayalam films and television. She made her acting debut in 2003 with Pattalam.

Early and personal life 
Born to M.K George and Achimma, Tessa attended St. Antony's Public School & Junior College, Anakkal, Kanjirappally. She finished her early education at Mater Dei in New Delhi and finished her college education at St. Teresa’s college, Cochin.

Career 
She made her debut as a heroine opposite Mammootty, in the movie Pattalam, directed by Lal Jose in the year 2003. 

She was handpicked by Lal Jose when she was successfully hosting the popular TV show Hello Good Evening in Kairali TV. She took a break from movies, after her debut, though she was active in TV shows and in TV commercials. She has made a comeback into the movie industry in the year 2015 playing the role of a journalist in the movie, Njan Samvidhanam Cheyyum by Balachandra Menon. This was followed by her role as "Rajamma" in the movie, Rajamma @yahoo. She played the pivotal role of an advocate, Adv. Anu G. Nair for the movie Marupadi, directed by V. M Vinu and the role of Sujatha, a mother of two main characters, in the movie, Goldcoins by Pramod Gopal, both of which saw their releases in 2016 and 2017 respectively.

Filmography

Films

Television

References

Actresses in Malayalam cinema
Indian film actresses
Actresses from Kottayam
21st-century Indian actresses
Indian women television presenters
Indian television presenters
Actresses in Malayalam television
St. Teresa's College alumni